Holy See – Switzerland relations are among the oldest bilateral diplomatic relations, beginning with the admission of a papal nuncio to Lucerne in 1586.  About 40% of the Swiss population are Catholics, and young Swiss men have served for centuries in the Pontifical Swiss Guard.

The bilateral relationship became lastingly fraught during the second half of the 19th century, after the modern Swiss state emerged from a civil war in which the mostly liberal and Protestant cantons defeated the Sonderbund, an alliance of conservative and Catholic cantons that had enjoyed the strong support of the Holy See. In 1873, at the height of the Kulturkampf, the Swiss Federal Council ordered the papal nuncio to leave Switzerland, ending diplomatic relations for about 50 years. The Catholic foreign minister Giuseppe Motta was eventually able to convince his colleagues to allow the return of a nuncio to Bern.

Switzerland, however, remained without diplomatic representation with the Holy See until 1991, when the government appointed a non-resident special envoy, which it upgraded to ambassadorial status in 2004. In May 2022, Switzerland opened its first resident embassy to the Holy See in Rome.

References 

 
Switzerland
Bilateral relations of Switzerland